The Nitrian Desert is a desert region in northwestern Egypt, lying between Alexandria and Cairo west of the Nile Delta. It is known for its history of Christian monasticism.

There were three monastic centres in the Nitrian Desert in Late Antiquity. Around 330, Macarius the Egyptian established a monastic colony in the Wadi El Natrun (Scetis), far from cultivable land. He founded a second centre, Kellia, on Anthony's suggestion, deeper into the desert. Kellia has been the object of scientific excavations. Only Scetis in the Wadi El Natrun remains a monastic site today.

See also
Desert Fathers
Abba Or
Desert of Mount Athos

References

Deserts of Egypt